Marcin Rogacewicz (born 25 March 1980 in Ciechanów) is a Polish television actor.

In 2007 he graduated from the Faculty of Acting School in Łódź. He debuted in a TV series Kryminalni.

Filmography 
 2008: Agentki, as Tomasz Muszyński vel Irina Dowbor
 2008: Kryminalni, as Michał Adamski
 2008–2018: Na dobre i na złe, as Przemysław Zapała
 2010–2012: Szpilki na Giewoncie, as Grzegorz Zwoliński
 2012–2017: Friends, as Michał Zalewski
 2018–2019: Korona królów, as Jan of Melsztyn

References

Polish male television actors
1980 births
Living people